Esmeralda Ossendrijver (born 2 October 1968) is a Dutch short track speed skater. She competed in the women's 3000 metre relay event at the 1994 Winter Olympics.

References

1968 births
Living people
Dutch female short track speed skaters
Olympic short track speed skaters of the Netherlands
Short track speed skaters at the 1994 Winter Olympics
Sportspeople from The Hague